Hughes Township is a township in Nodaway County, in the U.S. state of Missouri.

Hughes Township was erected in 1845, and named after General Andrew S. Hughes, a pioneer citizen.

References

Townships in Missouri
Townships in Nodaway County, Missouri
Populated places established in 1845
1845 establishments in Missouri